Blackcomb may refer to:

Blackcomb Peak, a mountain in British Columbia
Whistler Blackcomb ski resort
 Blackcomb Village, a ski village inside the ski resort
Blackcomb Glacier Provincial Park
Windows Blackcomb, a canceled version of Microsoft Windows
Black Combe, a fell in the Lake District of England